Mirna Khayat (born 1973) is a Lebanese music video director. 
Khayat has worked with names like Amal Hijazi, Pascale Machaalani, George Wassouf, Mayssam Nahas and Nancy Ajram.

Khayat's breakthrough came in 2003 when she was chosen to work with Amal Hijazi for Hijazi's music video "Romansyia", which showed Hijazi has a young star who had fallen in love. Mirna went to direct Hijazi's other music videos such as "Bedawwar A Albi" and "Mistanie Eiy" which also gained favourable reviews.

In 2005, Mirna Khayat returned to the music scene with Amal Hijazi's "Baad Sneene"and later "Baheb Noa Kalamak". 
In 2007, Khayat directed Nancy Ajram's Gulf song, "Meshtagel Leh". She has also directed some hit music videos such as Melissa's "Leil ya Leil ", "Kam Sana", and "Garahtak".

In recent years, Khayat has directed the biggest music video hit "Byehsidouni" for George Wassouf.

References

External links
Official Mirna Khayat Fan-Club

1973 births
Lebanese film directors
Living people
Female music video directors
Lebanese women film directors
Lebanese music video directors
Lebanese Christians